Claudio Falcão Santos (born 3 July 1994) is a Brazilian football player. He plays for Farense.

Club career
He made his Primeira Liga debut for Desportivo das Aves on 6 August 2017 in a game against Sporting.

Honours
Aves
Taça de Portugal: 2017–18

References

External links
 

1994 births
Sportspeople from Mato Grosso do Sul
Living people
Brazilian footballers
Independente Futebol Clube players
C.D. Aves players
S.C. Farense players
Brazilian expatriate footballers
Expatriate footballers in Portugal
Brazilian expatriate sportspeople in Portugal
Primeira Liga players
Association football midfielders